The Other Woman is a novel  by Hank Phillippi Ryan and was originally published by Forge Books (later acquired by Tor Books and currently owned by Macmillan Publishers) on 4 September 2012 which then went on to win the Mary Higgins Clark Award in 2013.

In 2012, the book was also nominated to receive the Agatha Award, subsequently the Anthony Award in 2013.

References 

2012 American novels
Anthony Award-winning works
American crime novels
Forge Books books